Appakudal is a panchayat town in the  Erode district in the state of Tamil Nadu, India.  Appakudal is an industrial centre.  It has a sugar factory, viz., Sakthi Sugars Limited,  the families of the workers of which form a major part of population of this town.

Geography
Aapakudal is located between Bhavani and Sathyamangalam.  Water from the Bhavanisagar Dam flows to the Bhavani River through Appakudal.  A seasonal lake is located in the northern part of the town.

Demographics
,  Appakudal had a population of 9,516.  Males constitute 51% of the population and females 49%. Appakudal has an average literacy rate of 59%, lower than the national average of 59.5%; with 69% of the males and 49% of females literate.  10% of the population is under six years of age.

Education

Primary & secondary
 Sakthi Primary School, Sakthi Nagar.
 Sakthi Higher Secondary School, Nachimuthupuram, Sakthi Nagar.
 Government Higher Secondary School, A. Pudupalayam.
 Government Middle School, A.Pudupalayam
 Sri Vivekananda Vidhya Bhavan Matric Higher Secondary School, Bhavani Mainroad.
 Kavitha Nursery & Primary School, Sakthi Nagar.
 Bhavani Union Middle School, Appakudal.
 Panchayat Union middle school, Appkudal.

College
 Sakthi Polytechnic College. Sakthi Nagar.
 Dharmarathnakara Dr Mahalingam Institute of Paramedical Sciences & Research. Sakthi Nagar.
 Kumaraguru Institute of Agriculture
 Sakthi Institute of Technology

Hospitals
 Government Primary Health Centre
 V.M.K Hospital
 Saravan Hospital
 SPK Hospital,
 Sriram Child And Maternity Hospital
 Government Veterinary Hospital
 NM Hospital
 Raghav Hospital

Neighborhoods
Bhavani
Komarapalayam
Bhavanisagar
Ooratchikottai
Sathyamangalam
Paruvatchi
Lakshmi Nagar

References

Cities and towns in Erode district